Brewin's Canal Section is a  geological site of Special Scientific Interest in the West Midlands. The site was notified in 1990 under the Wildlife and Countryside Act 1981 and is currently managed by the Country Trust. The site was deemed invaluable for understanding the development of coal deposits in the Midlands.

See also
List of Sites of Special Scientific Interest in the West Midlands

References

 Brewin's Canal Section English Nature. Retrieved on 2008-05-26

Brewin's Canal Section
Sites of Special Scientific Interest in the West Midlands (county)
Geology of the West Midlands (county)